An orphan work is a copyright-protected work for which rightsholders are positively indeterminate or uncontactable. Sometimes the names of the originators or rightsholders are known, yet it is impossible to contact them because additional details cannot be found. A work can become orphaned through rightsholders being unaware of their holding, or by their demise (e.g. deceased persons or defunct companies) and establishing inheritance has proved impracticable. In other cases, comprehensively diligent research fails to determine any authors, creators or originators for a work. Since 1989, the amount of orphan works in the United States has increased dramatically since some works are published anonymously, assignments of rights are not required to be disclosed publicly, and registration is optional and, thus, many works' statuses with respect to who holds which rights remain unknown to the public even when those rights are being actively exploited by authors or other rightsholders.

Extent
Precise figures of orphan works are not readily available, even though libraries, archives and museums hold a vast number of them. In April 2009, a study estimated that the collections of public sector organisations in the UK held about 25 million orphan works. Examples of orphan works include photographs that do not note the photographer, such as photos from scientific expeditions and historical images, old folk music recordings, little known novels and other literature. Software which becomes an orphaned work is usually known as abandonware. In 2015, the Computerspielemuseum Berlin estimated that around 50% of their video game collection consisted of at least partial orphans. Source code escrow can prevent software orphaning but is seldom applied.

Impact
In countries whose laws do not specifically allow for the use of orphan works, orphan works are not available for legal use by filmmakers, archivists, writers, musicians or broadcasters. Because rightsholders cannot be identified and located to obtain permission, historical and cultural records such as period film footage, photographs, and sound recordings cannot be legally incorporated in contemporary works in such countries (unless the incorporation qualifies as fair use). Public libraries, educational institutions, and museums that digitise old manuscripts, books, sound recordings, and film may choose to not digitise orphan works or make orphan works available to the public for fear that a re-appearing rightsholder may sue them for damages.

Causes
According to Neil Netanel the increase in orphan works is the result of two factors: (1) that copyright terms have been lengthened, and (2) that copyright is automatically conferred without registration or renewal. Only a fraction of old copyrighted works are available to the public. Netanel argues that rightsholders have "no incentive to maintain a work in circulation" or otherwise make their out-of-print content available unless they can hope to earn more money doing so than by producing new works or engaging in more lucrative activities. Some works are deliberately published in ways that make them orphan works (or make certain rights to them "orphan rights"). In particular, all anonymously self-published works are by definition orphan works, regardless of how much revenue they are generating for their authors through advertising or other means. Authors of orphan works argue that these modes of publishing and of earning revenues from orphan works are increasing, and are especially attractive to "whistleblowers, leakers, writers on controversial or stigmatized topics, and writers who fear harassment or retaliation if they are 'outed' or can be identified or located."

Specifics by country

Canada 
Canada has created a supplemental licensing scheme, under Section 77 of its Copyright Act, that allows licenses for the use of published works to be issued by the Copyright Board of Canada on behalf of unlocatable rightsholders, after a prospective licensor has made "reasonable efforts to locate [holders of] copyright". As of March 2019, the Board had issued 304 such licenses, and denied 24 applications.

European Union

The European Commission (EC), the civil branch of the European Union (EU), created a report on Digital Preservation of Orphan Works and Out-of-Print Works in 2007.

On 4 June 2008, European representatives of museums, libraries, archives, audiovisual archives and rightsholders signed a Memorandum of Understanding, calling for an orphan works legislation supported by rightsholders that would help cultural institutions to digitize books, films, and music whose authors are unknown, making them available to the public online. In 2009 the Strategic Content Alliance and the Collections Trust published a report on the scope and impact of orphan works and their effect on the delivery of web services to the public.

In October 2012 the European Union adopted Directive 2012/28/EU on Orphan Works. It applies to orphan works that were created in the EU as printed works (books, journals, magazines and newspapers), cinematographic and audio-visual works, phonograms, and works embedded or incorporated in other works or phonograms (e.g. pictures in a book). Under certain conditions, the directive can also apply to unpublished works (such as letters or manuscripts). Whether orphaned software and video games ("Abandonware") fall under the audiovisual works definition is a matter debated by scholars.

The Directive was influenced by a survey of the state of intellectual property law in the United Kingdom called the Hargreaves Review of Intellectual Property and Growth. James Boyle, one of the experts consulted for the Review, acknowledged the directive as "a start", but offered this criticism of the resulting policy:

By 2018, six years after the enactment of the directive, around 6,000 works had been entered into the orphan works registry that it created. Critics cited the low numbers as evidence "that the EU approach to orphan works is unreasonably complex and won’t adequately address the problem it’s trying to fix," namely enabling mass digitization efforts.

United Kingdom 
On 29 October 2014 the Intellectual Property Office (IPO) launched an online licensing scheme for orphan works. It differs from the EU's directive (which no longer applies in the UK) in several aspects, e.g. by allowing anyone instead of just cultural institutions to submit works, while however imposing application and license fees. A launch press release by the IPO was entitled "UK opens access to 91 million Orphan Works", but four years later, only 144 licenses had been granted, covering 877 works.

United States

Other nations 
Hungary, India, Japan, Saudi Arabia, and South Korea have established state licensing options for orphan works.

See also

 Copyright formalities
 Orphan film
 Orphaned technology
 Permission culture

References

 
Copyright law
Intellectual property law